Hanvey is a surname of Northern Irish origin. Notable people with the surname include:

Bobbie Hanvey (born 1945), Northern Irish photographer and radio broadcaster
Jock Hanvey (1882–1935), American college football player and coach
Keith Hanvey (born 1952), English professional footballer
Neale Hanvey, Scottish politician
Robert Jackson Hanvey (1899-1989), England international rugby union player

References

Surnames of Irish origin